Bob Chester (March 20, 1908 – October 29, 1966) was an American jazz and pop music bandleader and tenor saxophonist.

He was born in Detroit, Michigan, United States. Chester's stepfather ran General Motors's Fisher Body Works. He began his career as a sideman under Irving Aaronson, Ben Bernie, and Ben Pollack. He formed his own group in Detroit in the mid-1930s, with a Glenn Miller-influenced sound. This band was unsuccessful in local engagements and quickly dissolved. He then put together a new band on the East Coast under the direction of Tommy Dorsey and with arrangements by David Rose. This ensemble fared much better, recording for Bluebird Records.

Chester's group, billed "The New Sensation of the Nation," had its own radio show on CBS briefly in the fall of 1939. The twenty-five-minute program aired from the Hotel Van Cleve in Dayton, Ohio late on Thursday nights (actually 12:30 am Friday morning, Eastern Time); the September 21, 1939 edition can be heard on the One Day In Radio tapes, archived by Washington D.C. station WJSV.

Chester's Bluebird records have proved excellent sellers, both for retail dealers and coin phonograph operators such as "From Maine to California"; "Wait Till the Sun Shines, Nellie"; "Madeliaine"; and two songs from "Banjo Eyes" - "Not a Care in the World" and "A Nickel to My Name". His only national hit was "With the Wind and the Rain in Your Hair" (b/w "I Walk With Music"; Bluebird 10614), which featured Dolores O'Neill on vocals and went to No. 18 on the chart in April 1940.

Chester's orchestra included trumpeters Alec Fila, Nick Travis, Lou Mucci, and Conrad Gozzo, saxophonists Herbie Steward and Peanuts Hucko, drummer Irv Kluger, and trombonist Bill Harris. His female singers included Dolores O'Neill, Kathleen Lane, and Betty Bradley; among his male singers were Gene Howard, Peter Marshall, Bob Haymes, and Al Stuart.

The orchestra disbanded in the mid-1940s, due in part to the shrinking market for big band sound. After a stint as a disc jockey at WKMH radio, Chester assembled another band for a short time in the early 1950s, but after it failed he retired from music and returned to Detroit, to work for the rest of his life in auto manufacturing.

Bob Chester died in October 1966, at the age of 58.

References

External links
Bob Chester at Parabrisas.com

1908 births
1966 deaths
American jazz bandleaders
American jazz saxophonists
American male saxophonists
Big band bandleaders
20th-century American saxophonists
20th-century American male musicians
American male jazz musicians
Bluebird Records artists